Coleophora agasta is a moth of the family Coleophoridae that is endemic to Turkmenistan.

References

External links

agasta
Moths of Asia
Endemic fauna of Turkmenistan
Moths described in 1992